The 2022 North Carolina Tar Heels baseball team represented the University of North Carolina at Chapel Hill in the 2022 NCAA Division I baseball season. The Tar Heels played their home games at Boshamer Stadium as a member of the Atlantic Coast Conference. They were led by head coach Scott Forbes, in his second season as head coach.

Previous season

The 2021 Tar Heels finished the season with a 28–27 (18–18) record. They tied for 3rd place in the ACC's Coastal Division, and made the NCAA Tournament's Lubbock Regional, where they upset UCLA in the first game before losing to hosts Texas Tech, and the Bruins, to be eliminated.

Personnel

Roster

Coaching Staff

Schedule and results 

! style="" | Regular Season
|- valign="top" 

|- bgcolor="#ddffdd"
| February 18 || Seton Hall* || || Boshamer Stadium • Chapel Hill, NC || W 14–3 ||  Schaeffer (1–0)  || Payero (0–1) || None || 2,155 || 1–0 || –
|- bgcolor="#ddffdd"
| February 19 || Seton Hall* || || Boshamer Stadium • Chapel Hill, NC || W 19–0 || Palermo (1–0) || Waldis (0–1)  || None || 2,042 || 2–0 || –
|- bgcolor="#ddffdd"
| February 20 || Seton Hall* || || Boshamer Stadium • Chapel Hill, NC || W 7–3 || Rapp (1–0) || O'Neill (0–1)  || None || 1,950 || 3–0 || –
|- bgcolor="#ddffdd"
| February 22 || Elon* || || Boshamer Stadium • Chapel Hill, NC || W 5–1 || Bovair (1–0) || Evans (0–1) || None || 1,597 || 4–0 || –
|- bgcolor="#ddffdd"
| February 25 || No. 25 ECU* || ||  Boshamer Stadium • Chapel Hill, NC || W 7–4 || Schaeffer (2–0) || Saylor (0–2) || O'Brien (1) || 2,939 || 5–0 || –
|- bgcolor="#ddffdd"
| February 26 || No. 25 ECU* || || Boshamer Stadium • Chapel Hill, NC || W 2–0  || Carlson (1–0) || Kuchmaner (0–1) || O'Brien (2) || 2,831 || 6–0 || –
|- bgcolor="#ffdddd"
| February 27 || at No. 25 ECU* || || Clark–LeClair Stadium • Greenville, NC|| L 0–5 || Spivey (1–0) || <small> Peavyhouse (0–1) || Brooks (1) || 3,795 || 6–1 || –
|-

|- bgcolor="#ddffdd"
| March 1 || Longwood* || No. 24 || Boshamer Stadium • Chapel Hill, NC || W 16–1 || Mott (1–0) || Melnyk (0–1) || None || 1,692 || 7–1 || –
|- bgcolor="#ddffdd"
| March 2 || Winthrop* || No. 24 || Boshamer Stadium • Chapel Hill, NC || W 7–3 || Pry (1–0) || Mims (0–1) || None || 1,929 || 8–1 || –
|- bgcolor="#ddffdd"
| March 4 || Coastal Carolina* || No. 24 || Boshamer Stadium • Chapel Hill, NC || W 4–3 || Mott (2–0) || Billings (0–2) || None || 2,861 || 9–1 || –
|- bgcolor="#ddffdd"
| March 5 || Coastal Carolina* || No. 24 || Boshamer Stadium • Chapel Hill, NC || W 4–0 || Gillian (1–0) || VanScoter (1–1) || None || 2,572 || 10–1 || –
|- bgcolor="#ddffdd"
| March 6 || Coastal Carolina* || No. 24 || Boshamer Stadium • Chapel Hill, NC || W 4–3 || Ollio (1–0) || Barrow (0–1) || None || 2,651 || 11–1 || –
|- bgcolor="#ffdddd"
| March 8 || at No. 14 Liberty* || No. 15 || Liberty Baseball Stadium • Lynchburg, VA|| L 0–1 || Fluharty (1–0) || Bovair (1–1) || Hungate (4) || 2,692 || 11–2 || –
|- bgcolor="#bbbbbb"
| March 9 || Georgetown* || No. 15 || Boshamer Stadium • Chapel Hill, NC || postponed || – || – || – || – || – || –
|- bgcolor="#ddffdd"
| March 11 || Pittsburgh || No. 15 || Boshamer Stadium • Chapel Hill, NC || W 7–4 || Mott (3–0) || Gilbertson (1–2) || O'Brien (3) || – || 12–2 || 1–0
|- bgcolor="#ddffdd"
| March 12 || Pittsburgh || No. 15 || Boshamer Stadium • Chapel Hill, NC || W 4–3 || Peavyhouse (1–1) || Summers (1–1) || None || 1,645 || 13–2 || 2–0
|- bgcolor="#ddffdd"
| March 13 || Pittsburgh || No. 15  || Boshamer Stadium • Chapel Hill, NC || W 9–2 || Mott (4–0) || Stuart (1–2) || Rapp (1) || 1,637 || 14–2 || 3–0
|- bgcolor="#ddffdd"
| March 15 || VMI* || No. 15 || Boshamer Stadium • Chapel Hill, NC ||W 5–1 || Peavyhouse (2–1) || Lloyd (1–2) || Palermo (1) || 1,499 || 15–2 || 3–0
|- bgcolor="#bbbbbb"
| March 16 || Richmond* || No. 15 || Boshamer Stadium • Chapel Hill, NC || postponed || – || – || – || – || – || –
|- bgcolor="#ddffdd"
| March 18 || at Duke || No. 15  || Durham Bulls Athletic Park • Durham, NC || W 10–5 || Mott (5–0) || Johnson (1–4) || None || 1,507 || 16–2 || 4–0
|- bgcolor="#ffdddd"
| March 19 || at Duke || No. 15 || Durham Bulls Athletic Park • Durham, NC || L 3–9 || Allen (1–1) || Peavyhouse (2–2) || None || 2,780 || 16–3 || 4–1
|- bgcolor="#ddffdd"
| March 20 || at Duke || No. 15 || Durham Bulls Athletic Park • Durham, NC || W 4–1 || Bovair (2–1) || Seidl 1–1 || O'Brien (4) || 2,186 || 17–3 || 5–1
|- bgcolor="#ddffdd"
| March 22 || Appalachian State* || No. 13 || Boshamer Stadium • Chapel Hill, NC || W 4–2 || O'Brien (1–0) || Ellington (0–2) || None || 2,614 || 18–3 || 5–1
|-bgcolor="#ffdddd"
| March 25 || at Miami (FL) || No. 13 || Alex Rodriguez Park at Mark Light Field • Coral Gables, FL || L 5–8 || Palmquist (5–1) || Schaeffer (2–1) || Walters (6) || 3,172 || 18–4 || 5–2
|-bgcolor="#ffdddd"
| March 26 || at Miami (FL) || No. 13 || Alex Rodriguez Park at Mark Light Field • Coral Gables, FL || L 3–7 || Torres (2–0) || Mott (5–1) || None || 3,193 || 18–5 || 5–3
|-bgcolor="#ffdddd"
| March 27 || at Miami (FL) || No. 13 || Alex Rodriguez Park at Mark Light Field • Coral Gables, FL || L 2–3 (14) || Arguelles (1–1) || Gillian (1–1) || None || 2,885 || 18–6 || 5–4
|- bgcolor="#ddffdd"
| March 29 || UNCW* || No. 18 || Boshamer Stadium • Chapel Hill, NC || W 6–4 || Peavyhouse (3–2) || Overton (0–1) || Mott (1) || 1,891 || 19–6 || 5–4
|-

|- bgcolor="#ffdddd"
| April 1 || Virginia Tech || No. 18 || Boshamer Stadium • Chapel Hill, NC || L 1–12 || Green (2–2) || Bovair (2–2) || None || 2,601 || 19–7 || 5–5
|- bgcolor="#ffdddd"
| April 2 || Virginia Tech || No. 18 || Boshamer Stadium • Chapel Hill, NC || L 3–7 || Hackenberg (5–0) || Carlson (1–1) || None || 2,745 || 19–8 || 5–6
|- bgcolor="#ddffdd"
| April 3 || Virginia Tech || No. 18 || Boshamer Stadium • Chapel Hill, NC || W 10–6 || Rapp (2–0) || Kennedy (1–3) || Schaeffer (1) || 2,474 || 20–8 || 6–6
|- bgcolor="#ffdddd"
| April 6 || vs. South Carolina* || No. 22 || Truist Field • Charlotte, NC || L 2–15 || Hunter (5–2) || Gillian (1–2) || None || 3,456 || 20–9 || 6–6
|- bgcolor="#ddffdd"
| April 8 || at Louisville || No. 22 || Jim Patterson Stadium • Louisville, KY || W 13–9 || Mott (6–1) || Kuehner (4–2) || None || 2,162 || 21–9 || 7–6
|- bgcolor="#ffdddd"
| April 9 || at Louisville || No. 22 || Jim Patterson Stadium • Louisville, KY || L 8–9 (10) || Prosecky (2–0) || Palermo (1–1) || None || 2,102 || 21–10 || 7–7
|- bgcolor="#ffdddd"
| April 10 || at Louisville || No. 22 || Jim Patterson Stadium • Louisville, KY|| L 5–6 (14) || Wiegman (1–0) || Ollio (1–1) || None || 2,103 || 21–11 || 7–8
|- bgcolor="#ffdddd"
| April 12 || NC A&T* ||  || Boshamer Stadium • Chapel Hill, NC || L 6–7 || Thomas (1–0) || Peavyhouse (3–3) || Winebarger (1) || 1,942 || 21–12 || 7–8
|- bgcolor="#ffdddd"
| April 15 || Georgia Tech || || Boshamer Stadium • Chapel Hill, NC || L 12–15 || Maxwell (3–0) || Mott (6–2) || Brown (4) || 2,861 || 21–13 || 7–9
|- bgcolor="#ddffdd"
| April 16 || Georgia Tech ||  || Boshamer Stadium • Chapel Hill, NC || W 10–5 || Schaeffer (3–1) || McGuire (2–2) || None || 2,636 || 22–13 || 8–9
|- bgcolor="#ffdddd"
| April 17 || Georgia Tech ||  || Boshamer Stadium • Chapel Hill, NC || L 8–11 || Brown (2–0) || Bovair (2–3) || Medich (1) || 2,028 || 22–14 || 8–10
|- bgcolor="#ddffdd"
| April 19 || Campbell* ||  || Boshamer Stadium • Chapel Hill, NC || W 7–4 || Bovair (3–3) || Kuehler (1–5) || Palermo (2) || 2,053 || 23–14 || 8–10
|- bgcolor="#ffdddd"
| April 22 || at No. 11 Virginia ||  || Davenport Field • Charlottesville, VA || L 2–4 || Woolfolk (3–0) || Carlson (1–2) || Neeck (1) || 4,078 || 23–15 || 8–11
|- bgcolor="#ffdddd"
| April 23 || at No. 11 Virginia || || Davenport Field • Charlottesville, VA || L 7–11 (10) || Kosanovich (2–0) || Gillian (1–3) || None || 4,712 || 23–16 || 8–12
|- bgcolor="#ffdddd"
| April 24 || at No. 11 Virginia || || Davenport Field • Charlottesville, VA || L 3–10 || Berry (5–2) || Mott (6–3) || None || 4,559 || 23–17 || 8–13
|- bgcolor="#ddffdd"
| April 27 || Liberty* ||  || Boshamer Stadium • Chapel Hill, NC || W 8–1 || Schaeffer (4–1) || Gibson (3–4) || None || 2,004 || 24–17 || 8–13
|-

|- bgcolor="#ddffdd"
| May 3 || Charlotte* || || Boshamer Stadium • Chapel Hill, NC || W 4–3 (10) || Bovair (4–3) || Kramer (2–1) || None || 1,876 || 25–17 || 8–13
|- bgcolor="#ddffdd"
| May 6 || at NC State ||  || Doak Field • Raleigh, NC || W 8–7 || Gillian (2–3) || Lawson (4–2) || None || 3,048 || 26–17 || 9–13
|- bgcolor="#ffdddd"
| May 8 || at NC State ||  || Doak Field • Raleigh, NC || L 2–9 || Willadsen (3–3) || Schaeffer (4–2) || None || 3,048 || 26–18 || 9–14
|- bgcolor="#ddffdd"
| May 8 || at NC State ||  || Doak Field • Raleigh, NC || W 7–6 || Bovair (5–3) || Villaman (3–3) || Palermo (3) || 2,744 || 27–18 || 10–14
|- bgcolor="#ddffdd"
| May 10 || Gardner-Webb* || || Boshamer Stadium • Chapel Hill, NC || W 12–5 || O'Brien (2–0) || Pilla (0–2) || None || 1,821 || 28–18 || 10–14
|- bgcolor="#ddffdd"
| May 11 || Charleston Southern* || || Boshamer Stadium • Chapel Hill, NC || W 12–1 || Sandy (1–0) || Candelas (0–1) || None || 1,826 || 29–18 || 10–14
|- bgcolor="#ddffdd"
| May 13 || Wake Forest || || Boshamer Stadium • Chapel Hill, NC || W 3–0 || Rapp (3–0) || Lowder (9–3) || Palermo (4) || 1,680 || 30–18 || 11–14
|- bgcolor="#ddffdd"
| May 14 || Wake Forest || || Boshamer Stadium • Chapel Hill, NC || W 12–3 || Schaeffer (5–2) || Hartle (5–6) || None || 1,969 || 31–18 || 12–14
|- bgcolor="#ffdddd"
| May 15 || Wake Forest || || Boshamer Stadium • Chapel Hill, NC || L 2–11 || McGraw (4–2) || Bovair (5–4) || None || 2,314 || 31–19 || 12–15
|- bgcolor="#cccccc"
| May 17 || at UNCW* || || Boshamer Stadium • Chapel Hill, NC || colspan=7 | Canceled
|- bgcolor="#ddffdd"
| May 19 || No. 20 Florida State || || Boshamer Stadium • Chapel Hill, NC || W 7–5 || Palermo (2–1) || Crowell (5–1) || None || 2,235 || 32–19 || 13–15
|- bgcolor="#ddffdd"
| May 20 || No. 20 Florida State || || Boshamer Stadium • Chapel Hill, NC || W 10–4 || Schaeffer (6–2) || Messick (6–4) || None || 2,777 || 33–19 || 14–15
|- bgcolor="#ddffdd"
| May 21 || No. 20 Florida State || || Boshamer Stadium • Chapel Hill, NC || W 11–0 || Pry (2–0) || Hubbart (8–2) || None || 2,486 || 34–19 || 15–15

|- 
! style="" | Postseason
|-

|- bgcolor="#ddffdd"
| May 24 || vs. (12) Clemson || (8) || Truist Field • Charlotte, NC || W 9–2 || Carlson (2–2) || Anglin (6–6) || None || 3,582 || 35–19 || 1–0
|- bgcolor="#ddffdd"
| May 27 || vs. No. 2 (1) Virginia Tech || (8) || Truist Field • Charlotte, NC || W 10–0 || Schaeffer (7–2) || Hackenberg (10–2) || None || 7,117 || 36–19 || 2–0
|- bgcolor="#ddffdd"
| May 28 || vs. No. 16 (4) Notre Dame || (8) || Truist Field • Charlotte, NC || W 7–2 || Rapp (4–0) || Tyrell (5–1) || Palermo (5) || 4,912 || 37–19 || 3–0
|- bgcolor="#ddffdd"
| May 29 || vs. (10) NC State || (8) || Truist Field • Charlotte, NC || W 9–5 || Carlson (3–2) || Whitaker (2–4) || None || 10,500 || 38–19 || 4–0

|- bgcolor="#ddffdd"
| June 3 || vs. (4) Hofstra || No. 10 (1) || Boshamer Stadium • Chapel Hill, NC || W 15–4 || Carlson (4–2) || Camarda (8–2) || None || 3,551 ||39–19 || 1–0 
|- bgcolor="#ffdddd"
| June 4 || vs. (3) VCU || No. 10 (1) || Boshamer Stadium • Chapel Hill, NC || L 3–4 || Ellis (5–4) || Schaeffer (7–3) || Wilson (3) || 3,843 || 39–20 || 1–1
|- bgcolor="#ddffdd"
| June 5 || vs. (2) Georgia || No. 10 (1) || Boshamer Stadium • Chapel Hill, NC || W 6–5 || Pry (3–0) || Wagner (5–2) || O'Brien (5) || 3,321 || 40–20 || 2–1
|- bgcolor="#ddffdd"
| June 5 || vs. (3) VCU || No. 10 (1) || Boshamer Stadium • Chapel Hill, NC || W 19–8 || O'Brien (3–0) || Furman (6–1) || Bovair (1) || 3,626 || 41–20 || 3–1
|- bgcolor="#ddffdd"
| June 6 || vs. (3) VCU || No. 10 (1) || Boshamer Stadium • Chapel Hill, NC || W 7–3 || Gillian (3–3) || Davis (5–3) || None || 4,160 || 42–20 || 4–1

|- bgcolor="#ffdddd"
| June 11 || vs. Arkansas || No. 10 || Boshamer Stadium • Chapel Hill, NC || L 1–4 || Noland (7–5) || Carlson (4–3) || Smith (2) || 3,794 || 42–21 || 0–1
|- bgcolor="#ffdddd"
| June 12 || vs. Arkansas || No. 10 || Boshamer Stadium • Chapel Hill, NC || L 3–4 || Morris (6–0) || O'Brien (3–1) || None || 3,831 || 42–22 || 0–2

| style="font-size:88%" | All rankings from D1Baseball except for Super Regional and College World Series where national seeds are used instead.

Chapel Hill Super Regional

Rankings

References 

North Carolina Tar Heels
North Carolina Tar Heels baseball seasons
North Carolina Tar Heels baseball
North Carolina
Atlantic Coast Conference baseball champion seasons